UMM may refer to:

 UN/CEFACT's Modeling Methodology (UMM), a business process modeling methodology of the United Nations
 UMM (União Metalo-Mecânica), a metal works factory and former Portuguese automobile manufacturer
 University of Minnesota Morris
 Underground Music Movement an Italian disco label, later turned clothing line
 Urban Male Magazine, a Canadian men's magazine
 Umm Kulthum, Egyptian singer
 "Um" or "umm", an instance of speech disfluency
 UMM blocks, Urea-molasses multinutrient blocks
 Arabic word for mother
University of Maine at Machias, a college in Machias, Maine
University of Muhammadiyah Malang, a college in Malang, Indonesia
University of Medicine, Mandalay, a medical institute in Mandalay.
 Unified Markov model